Locust (also known as Locust Point) is an unincorporated community located within Middletown Township in Monmouth County, New Jersey, United States. It is situated along the north banks of the Navesink River and Claypit Creek. The area consists of mostly medium-to-large sized houses throughout the hilly terrain of this part of the township. The Oceanic Bridge connects Locust with Rumson to the south.

References

External links

History, Middletown Township website]
Local Names (a publication of the NJ Department of Transportation); accessed through New Jersey and You: Perfect Together (NJ state travel site); accessed 9 September 2006.

Middletown Township, New Jersey
Unincorporated communities in Monmouth County, New Jersey
Unincorporated communities in New Jersey